Micromischodus sugillatus is a species of halftooth endemic to the Amazon Basin.  It is the only described species in its genus.

References
 

Hemiodontidae

Fish of South America
Fish of Brazil
Endemic fauna of Brazil
Taxa named by Tyson R. Roberts
Fish described in 1971